The Divisions of British India were administrative units of the Government of the British Raj or Indian Empire.

Divisions in Bengal
The seven Bengal Regulation Districts were named as 'divisions' in 1851:
Jessore Division, area 14,853 sq mi, population 5,345,472 (1851)
Bhagalpur Division area 26,464 sq mi, population 8,431,000
Cuttack Division, area 12,664 sq mi, population 2,793,883
British division 
(Moorshedabad), area 17,556 sq mi, population 6,815,876
Dacca Division, area 20,942 sq mi, population 4,055,800
Patna Division, area 13,803 sq mi, population 7,000,000
Chittagong Division, area 7,410 sq mi, population 2,406,950

Divisions of Eastern Bengal and Assam
The divisions of Eastern Bengal and Assam Province 1905—1912:
Dacca Division
Chittagong Division
Rajshahi Division 
Assam Valley Division
Surma Valley and Hill Districts Division

Divisions in Baroda
Kadi Division
Baroda Division
Amreli Division
Navsari Division

Divisions in Bombay
Northern Division
Southern Division
Central Division
Sind Division

Divisions in Burma
Arakan Division
Pegu Division
Irrawaddy Division
Tenasserim Division
Mimbu Division
Mandalay Division
Sagaing Division
Meiktila Division

Divisions in Central India

Gwalior Residency
Bundelkhand Agency
Baghelkhand Agency
Malwa Agency
Bhopal Agency
Indore Residency
Bhopawar Agency
Chhattisgarh Division
Nagpur Division 
Jubbulpore Division
Nerbudda Division
Berar Division

Divisions of Hyderabad
Aurangabad Division
Gulbarga Division
Gushanabad Division (Medak Division)
Warangal Division

Divisions in Rajputana

Western Rajputana States Residency
Haraoti and Tonk Agency
Mewar Residency
Eastern Rajputana States Agency
Kotah and Jhalawar Agency

Divisions in Agra
Meerut Division
Agra Division
Bareilly Division
Allahabad Division
Benares Division
Gorakhpur Division
Kumaun Division

Divisions in Oudh
Lucknow Division formerly also Sitapur Division
Faizabad Division (Fyzabad Division)

Divisions in Punjab
Lahore Division
Rawalpindi Division
Multan Division
Ambala Division and Delhi Division until 1921
Jalandhar Division

See also
Medak Gulshanabad Division
Presidencies and provinces of British India
Subdivisions of British India
Territorial evolution of the British Empire

References

External links
Pamphlets issued by the India office and by other British and Indian governmental agencies, relating to the government of India, and to various political, economic, and social questions concerning it and Burma

 
Subdivisions of British India